Pseudocamponotus is an extinct, monotypic genus of ant. This genus was first described by F.M. Carpenter in 1930. The type species is Pseudocamponotus elkoanus, whose fossil was found in Nevada.

Species
Pseudocamponotus elkoanus

References

Further reading
Pseudocamponotus - Antwiki

Formicinae
Monotypic ant genera
Fossil ant genera